Montanus was the second century founder of Montanism and a self proclaimed prophet. Montanus emphasized the work of the Holy Spirit, in a manner which set him apart from the Great Church.

Life 
Only very little is known about the life of Montanus. Montanus used to be a pagan priest but later converted into Christianity. Montanus began his prophesying in a village called Ardabau, located in Phrygia. The date of when Montanus started prophesying is somewhere around 157–172, however the Church Fathers gave differing dates on the start of Montanism. During his life Montanus was assisted by two women, Prisca and Maximilla, who also claimed to have prophecies.

Teachings 
The teachings of Montanism include:

 That a new age of prosperity would come, and New Jerusalem will soon be established in Pepuza.
 One could marry only once.
 Abandoning marriage for spiritual reasons was allowed.
 Every true Christian had to have recognizable spiritual gifts.
 Martyrdom was encouraged and trying to escape was seen as bad
 The prophets could forgive sins.
 The church could never permit apostates, murderers and fornicators back.
 Opposition to formalism in theology.
 A high emphasis on morality.

Impact 
The influence of Montanus and Marcion helped to spur the early church to begin the process of developing the New Testament canon. Montanus was heavily attacked by other early church theologians and seen as a heretic. However, Tertullian adopted Montanism.

References 

Heresy in ancient Christianity
2nd-century Romans
Converts to Christianity from pagan religions
Montanism